The 2018 Savannah Challenger was a professional tennis tournament played on clay courts. It was the tenth edition of the tournament which was part of the 2018 ATP Challenger Tour. It took place in Savannah, Georgia, United States between 30 April and 6 May 2018.

Singles main-draw entrants

Seeds

Other entrants
The following players received wildcards into the singles main draw:
  Trent Bryde
  Frank Dancevic
  Strong Kirchheimer
  Sam Riffice

The following player received entry into the singles main draw as a special exempt:
  Noah Rubin

The following players received entry from the qualifying draw:
  Federico Coria
  Martín Cuevas
  Karue Sell
  João Pedro Sorgi

Champions

Singles

 Hugo Dellien def.  Christian Harrison 6–1, 1–6, 6–4.

Doubles

 Luke Bambridge /  Akira Santillan def.  Enrique López Pérez /  Jeevan Nedunchezhiyan 6–2, 6–2.

External links
Official Website

2018 ATP Challenger Tour
2018
2018 in American tennis
2018 in sports in Georgia (U.S. state)